Port letter and number (PLN) is a code identifying fishing vessels and other boats printed on the boat. This is used in Europe, including the United Kingdom. The format is XYZ123.

References

External links
A list of European port letters
A Guide to Fishing Port Registration Letters
Fishing port registration letters for Britain
Fishing port registration letters for Europe